"The King of the Klondike" or "The Argonaut of White Agony Creek" is a 1993 Scrooge McDuck comic by Don Rosa. It is the eighth of the original 12 chapters in the series The Life and Times of Scrooge McDuck. The story takes place from 1896 to 1897 and deals with Scrooge McDuck who participates in the Klondike Gold Rush. It takes place before The Prisoner of White Agony Creek and The Hearts of the Yukon.

The story was first published in the Danish Anders And & Co. #1993-29; the first American publication was in Uncle Scrooge #292, in June 1995.

Plot
Arriving at Skagway, Alaska, Scrooge begins on his journey to Dawson City, Yukon, during which he meets Wyatt Earp, and they go to a saloon for a drink. Wyatt gets into a brawl with a thug who tries to mug the two, and Scrooge is forced to pay for the ensuing damage, leaving him broke again. He gets a loan from Soapy Slick, who leaves their contract open enough to get more money from him via a 100% interest rate.

Scrooge takes part in the Klondike Gold Rush, being mocked by Soapy along the way. However, he gets ahead of Soapy by using a makeshift didgeridoo to get to Dawson first. Hoping to best Scrooge, Soapy rents some space Glittering Goldie O'Gilt at her saloon for a loan-shark operation. She invites Scrooge in, but her blows her off.

Scrooge comes across a glacier, which contains an ice cave that he is told is by Casey Coot is too cold and dangerous to be safely traversed. He proceeds to do so, discovering inside a dead woolly mammoth. This takes him to White Agony Creek, where he begins his search for gold. During the winter, he goes to Dawson to buy tools to make a shed and a mine shaft. He finds Soapy doing business there and uses the gold he had found so far to pay off his interest, still unaware that he is working with Goldie. It is from here that Scrooge's harsher personality shades begin to develop, as he begins to speak to himself of destroying the creek for gain.

When Scrooge again goes to Dawson, now a bustling city, in Spring, he files a claim and finishes paying Soapy, ignoring the chaos going on around and the people shouting at him.

On his way back, Soapy knocks him out and takes him to his venue, where he wakes up chained and is taunted by Soapy and his henchmen. To further add salt to the wound, Soapy reads two letters from Scrooge's family: one from Downy, which reveals that the family has lost money and she is ill, and a second from Fergus, revealing that Downy has died.  An enraged Scrooge breaks free from his chains and single-handedly destroys the venue. The entire city (including an impressed Goldie) watches in shock and silence as Scrooge personally drags Soapy all the way to jail for claimjumping, where he will be deported to Alaska and never allowed back in Canada.

After returning to White Agony Creek, Scrooge deals with some miners trying to steal from his shaft. To scare them away, he picks up a rock from his sluice, which feels surprisingly heavy, enough to be solid gold.  Before he washes the mud off, he hesitates, knowing that if it is gold, he will be rich and his life will change forever.  He wonders if he will be the same person, or if he will lose his respect for hard work and his appreciation for simple pleasures: "Do I really... want to be rich?" Deciding the answer is yes, he plunges the rock into the sluice, and is amazed to see it is a solid gold nugget, "as big as a goose egg!". As Scrooge's yells of triumph echo across the valley, the final panel shows a caption saying not "The end", but "The beginning...", signifying that Scrooge's quest to make his fortune has come to an end, to be followed by his quest to become the richest person in the entire world.

Production
The original title of the story was "The Phoenix of White Agony Creek", but Rosa changed it before publishing to "The Argonaut of White Agony Creek", which was used in Europe. For the later American publishing, he used the new title "King of the Klondike".

The story uses "facts" from two stories by Carl Barks, Back to the Klondike and North of the Yukon. Otherwise most of the story uses real historic facts about the Klondike Gold Rush.

References

External links

King of the Klondike on Duckman 
The Life and Times of $crooge McDuck - Episode 8 

Disney comics stories
Donald Duck comics by Don Rosa
Fiction set in 1896
Fiction set in 1897
1993 in comics
Klondike Gold Rush in fiction
Comics set in the 19th century
Comics set in Alaska
Comics set in Yukon
The Life and Times of Scrooge McDuck